Rhinopristiformes  is an order of rays, cartilaginous fishes related to sharks, containing shovelnose rays and allied groups.

Families
 Family Glaucostegidae (giant guitarfishes)
 Family Pristidae (sawfishes)
 Family Rhinidae (wedgefishes)
 Family Rhinobatidae (guitarfishes)
 Family Trygonorrhinidae (banjo rays)

Additional families
Two additional families are associated with the order but their phylogenetic relationships have not been fully resolved:
 Family Platyrhinidae (thornback rays) 
 Family Zanobatidae (panrays)

Characteristics 
Species in the order Rhinopristiformes generally exhibit slow growth, late maturity, and low fecundity.
Alone or in combination, such features cause fishes in this group to be susceptible to extinction.

Threats
Rhinopristiformes are more prone to being caught in many different types of fishing equipment. These include the following:

 trawl
 gillnet
 seine net
 hook-and-line

They are caught for their meat but most importantly their fins. While the meat is mostly consumed locally the white fins are a delicacy and highly sought after. They are the most valuable part of Rhinopristiformes therefore their fins are in high demand. Both the combination of overfishing and the high desire for their fins has caused the Rhinopristiformes population to rapidly decline.

References

 
Rays
Cartilaginous fish orders